Markus Reichel (born 15 July 1968) is a German politician for the CDU and since 2021 member of the Bundestag, the federal diet.

Life and politics 

Reichel was born 1968 in the West German city of Munich and was directley elected to the Bundestag in 2021 in Dresden I.

References 

Living people
People from Munich
1968 births
Christian Democratic Union of Germany politicians
Members of the Bundestag 2021–2025
21st-century German politicians